Ota is a Portuguese freguesia ("civil parish"), located in the municipality of Alenquer. The population in 2011 was 1289, in an area of 46.32 km2.

Ota airport
Although Ota was originally chosen as the site for Lisbon's new airport, after much debate, Alcochete was chosen instead.

See also
Ota Airport

References

Parishes of Alenquer, Portugal